Lake Vernago or Vernagt-Stausee is a reservoir in Schnalstal, South Tyrol, Italy. The reservoir's water is used to generate electricity at the Etschwerke power station in the village of Naturns.

External links 

 Environment agency of South Tyrol 

Reservoirs in Italy
Lakes of South Tyrol